Kaori Takahashi (高橋かおり Takahashi Kaori; born August 29, 1975 in Kanagawa Prefecture, Japan) is a Japanese actress. She starred in the 2003 Fuji TV adaptation of Kuni Arisaka's novel , and played supporting roles in the 1986 NHK series Musashibō Benkei and the 1994 TV Asahi series .

References

External links
 
 JMDb profile (in Japanese)

1975 births
Living people
Actresses from Yokohama